Bilbrook railway station is a railway station which serves the village of Bilbrook in Staffordshire, England. This unstaffed station is a little unusual in that the platforms are staggered either side of a road overbridge.

It was known as Birches and Bilbrook Halt when opened, being renamed to Bilbrook on 6 May 1974.

Services

Bilbrook is typically served by one train per hour in each direction between Birmingham New Street and Shrewsbury via Wolverhampton which calls at all local stations from Wolverhampton - Shrewsbury. There's also an additional service in each direction in the morning and evening peak.  These services are operated by West Midlands Trains with just 1 Transport for Wales service a day Monday-Saturday and 2 a day on Sunday's . On Sundays, there is one train every hour in each direction operated by West Midlands Trains which again calls at all local stations from Wolverhampton - Shrewsbury. West Midlands Railway operate these services using  British Rail Class 170 Diesel Multiple Units, which are currently being withdrawn as the  British Rail Class 196 Diesel Multiple Units enter service. . .

Facilities
The station is unstaffed, but there is a ticket machine on platform 1 and covered waiting areas on both platforms.
There is a nearby bus stop with services operated by National Express West Midlands.

References

Further reading

External links

South Staffordshire District
Railway stations in Staffordshire
DfT Category F2 stations
Former Great Western Railway stations
Railway stations in Great Britain opened in 1934
Railway stations served by West Midlands Trains
Railway stations served by Transport for Wales Rail